This is a list of the National Register of Historic Places listings in Hays County, Texas.

This is intended to be a complete list of properties and districts listed on the National Register of Historic Places in Hays County, Texas. There are eight districts and 47 individual properties listed on the National Register in the county. The individually listed properties include eight State Antiquities Landmarks and 23 Recorded Texas Historic Landmarks while two districts contains several more Recorded Texas Historic Landmarks.

Current listings

The publicly disclosed locations of National Register properties and districts may be seen in a mapping service provided.

|}

Former listings

|}

See also

National Register of Historic Places listings in Texas
Recorded Texas Historic Landmarks in Hays County

References

External links

Registered Historic Places
Hays County
Buildings and structures in Hays County, Texas